Clive Edward Eksteen (born 2 December 1966) played seven Test matches and six One Day Internationals  for South Africa. In sixteen seasons at Transvaal (later Gauteng) he took 398 wickets at 30.05, also captaining the team for three seasons.

In March 2018 Eksteen was one of two Cricket South Africa (CSA) officials who were suspended after posing for a photograph with fans wearing Sonny Bill Williams masks in Port Elizabeth during the second Test between the Proteas and Australia. The masks appeared following a series of incidents involving David Warner and the South African cricket team and cricket fans in South Africa. The masks are in reference to a past encounter between David Warner's wife and Sonny Bill Williams. There was wide spread condemnation of a player's wife being "dragged through the mud" as an attempt "to shame her for her past."

Eksteen in May 2018 was allowed back to work at the CSA after his legal team reached an agreement with CSA for his sanction not to be made public.

In October 2019, he was suspended from his position as commercial manager of Cricket South Africa along with interim director Corrie van Zyl and chief operating officer Naasei Appiah for alleged non-payment of commercial rights fees during 2018 Mzansi Super League.

References

External links
 

1966 births
Living people
South African cricketers
South Africa Test cricketers
South Africa One Day International cricketers
Gauteng cricketers
South African Universities cricketers
Cricketers from Johannesburg